Colin Andrew Wilkie Cowie (born 3 January 1962) is an African-born American lifestyle advisor, author, interior designer and party planner.

Biography
Colin Cowie was born in Kitwe, Federation of Rhodesia and Nyasaland (now Zambia), and educated in South Africa. He moved to the United States in 1985 and founded Colin Cowie Lifestyle in 1992.

Cowie has appeared on the Today Show, The Oprah Winfrey Show and The Ellen DeGeneres Show. In addition to spending 7 years on the Home Shopping Network, he was a contributing family member to the CBS Early Show for eight years. He hosted the daily wedding planning show, Get Married on Lifetime TV, on which advised brides-to-be on fashion, decorating and other wedding-related topics. He also hosted the television series Everyday Elegance for five seasons.

Cowie has been profiled and quoted in The New York Times, People, Architectural Digest, InStyle, Town & Country, Us Weekly, Reader's Digest, USA Today, TV Guide, the Los Angeles Times, Modern Bride and the Chicago Daily Herald.

Cowie launched Wilkieblog.com in March 2017, and Colin Cowie Lifestyle announced the launch of a catering venture, F.O.O.D. Inc., in May 2017.

References

External links

1962 births
Living people
People from Kitwe
American gay writers
Television personalities from New York City
Writers from New York City
Zambian emigrants to the United States
Zambian expatriates in South Africa
Zambian people of Scottish descent
People with acquired American citizenship
21st-century LGBT people